Charles Peregrine Courtenay, 19th Earl of Devon (born 14 August 1975), styled as Lord Courtenay from 1998 until 2015, is an English hereditary peer and  barrister. He is a crossbench member of the House of Lords, having been elected at a by-election in 2018.

Education and career
The 19th Earl of Devon was educated at Eton College. After obtaining an MA degree from St John's College, Cambridge, in 1997, he followed his legal studies at the Inns of Court School of Law. Courtenay was admitted to the bar at Inner Temple in 1999, and to the California State Bar in 2004.

Personal life
He married the American actress A. J. Langer in a civil ceremony in 2004. A formal wedding later took place on 30 April 2005, in Los Angeles. With his father's death, the former Lord Courtenay succeeded to his father's peerage and estate.

The Earl and Countess of Devon have two children, both born in Los Angeles:
 Lady Joscelyn Skye Courtenay (born 31 January 2007)
 Jack Haydon Langer Courtenay, Lord Courtenay (born 16 August 2009)

Courtenay practised law with the firm of Latham & Watkins from 2005 to 2018, starting at their Los Angeles, California office. In January 2014, he permanently relocated his family to London and transferred to his firm's London office. In January 2019, he joined the Exeter firm Michelmores as a partner. He and his family now reside at the family's ancestral home of Powderham Castle in Devon, England.

Ancestry

References

1975 births
Alumni of St John's College, Cambridge
British emigrants to the United States
People educated at Eton College
California lawyers
Crossbench hereditary peers
Living people
Members of the Inner Temple
Charles Courtenay, 19th Earl of Devon
Earls of Devon (1553 creation)
People associated with Latham & Watkins
English barristers

Hereditary peers elected under the House of Lords Act 1999